Alnyash is a rural locality (a village) in Shagirtskoye Rural Settlement, Kuyedinsky District, Perm Krai, Russia. The population was 112 as of 2010. There is 1 street.

Geography 
Alnyash is located 33 km west of Kuyeda (the district's administrative centre) by road. Vilgurt is the nearest rural locality.

References 

Rural localities in Kuyedinsky District